John Stephen Parr (born 18 November 1952) is an English musician, singer, and songwriter, best known for his 1985 single "St. Elmo's Fire (Man in Motion)", charting at number one in the US and number six in the UK, and for his 1984 US number-six rock single "Naughty Naughty".  He has written and performed ten major motion-picture theme songs, including Three Men and a Baby and The Running Man. Parr has sold over 10 million albums and was nominated for a Grammy award for "St. Elmo's Fire" in 1985.

Biography
Parr was born in Worksop, England, in 1952. He first entered the music scene when he was 12 years old and formed a band with two fellow schoolmates, which they named The Silence. The band had achieved some success. They eventually became professional and started to tour Europe. He then joined a band named Bitter Suite, who were a success in the working men's clubs in Yorkshire, he then formed a supergroup with musicians from other working men's club bands, and named the band Ponders End, a band that set a new precedent for the bands in the north.

Work with Meat Loaf
Parr secured a publishing deal with Carlin America in 1983 and in the same year Meat Loaf asked him to write some songs for his new album. It led to a fateful meeting with John Wolff, who was tour manager for the Who. Foreseeing the initial demise of The Who, Wolff was looking for a new venture and considered Parr to be a suitable partner. Parr first visited America in 1984 and worked with Meat Loaf on Bad Attitude. Meanwhile, Wolff secured Parr's solo Atlantic recording deal with Ahmet Ertegun in New York.

Solo and 'The Business'
"Naughty Naughty" was Parr's first U.S. top-40 hit record, reaching No. 23 on the Billboard Hot 100 in 1985. In 1985, Parr toured with his band "The Business" supporting Toto, his first show with Toto at Carowinds Paladium (Charlotte, North Carolina), and playing 10,000-seat venues across America. By the end of the tour, David Foster asked Parr to record a song for the film St. Elmo's Fire. Parr and Foster wrote "St. Elmo's Fire" in honour of wheelchair athlete and activist Rick Hansen; it became the theme to St. Elmo's Fire (a "Brat Pack" film unrelated to Hansen's life or achievements). The song became a No. 1 hit for Parr around the world and garnered many awards, including a Grammy Award nomination. The song was tipped to take the Academy Award for best original song, but was not allowed onto the short list as, with Parr saying the song was written about Hansen and not the movie, it did not meet the Academy's criteria. Parr went on to tour with Tina Turner on the Private Dancer Tour and also with Heart and the Beach Boys. In his charity work with the David Foster foundation, Parr has shared the stage and the sports field with stars including John Travolta, Michael J. Fox, Celine Dion, Paul Anka, and Rob Lowe.

Parr later wrote "Under a Raging Moon" with Julia Downes for Roger Daltrey, a song that paid tribute to Keith Moon and told the story of the Who. The album became Daltrey's biggest solo success in America. Parr's last concert in the U.S. was a duet of the song with Daltrey at Madison Square Garden: joining them on stage were Yoko Ono, Julian Lennon, John Entwistle and Zak Starkey. John Entwistle had wanted to include the song in the set at Live Aid but was outvoted by the band. He went on to record the song himself.

Parr was soon singing with Marilyn Martin on the song "Through the Night", from the Quicksilver soundtrack (1986). Parr wrote and produced further tracks for Martin's debut album, including the hit "Night Moves". A year after, he wrote and sang the title songs "The Minute I Saw You", from Three Men and a Baby soundtrack, and the power ballad "Restless Heart" (a.k.a. "Running Away With You (Restless Heart)"), from The Running Man soundtrack (this song was re-released on the Man with a Vision album). After the success of Meat Loaf's album, Parr contributed to the next album with the hit duet "Rock 'n' Roll Mercenaries". From there, he began work with Albert Magnoli (director of Purple Rain) on the film American Anthem, for which he wrote and performed the main theme "Two Hearts". Parr's other film credits include "Naughty Naughty" from the cult horror film Near Dark and "Love Grammar" from the Karen Black movie Flight of the Spruce Goose. He has also written songs for Tom Jones, the Monkees, Tygers of Pan Tang, Romeo's Daughter, David Essex and Bucks Fizz.

The Pepsi Company and Jack Calmes Satellite TV Corporation wanted to try something new: a gig from London beamed live across America, Japan and Australia. Parr was the featured act, having done two similar shows (one from the Los Angeles Memorial Coliseum, where the flame was lit for a special performance of "St. Elmo's Fire", and was beamed live to Japan, and the New Year Christmas Show from London). The show was a success, reaching almost 50 million people and making broadcast history for the network. That same year Parr was signed by US clothing designer "Chams De Baron" to promote their sports leisure range, and featured in fashion magazines followed, and a US-wide poster campaign used Parr's image on America's major city buses for the summer. Later that year, Parr co-presented the UK leg of the American Music Awards with Phil Collins.

In 1988, Parr was offered the opportunity to collaborate with "Mutt" Lange by co-producing an album for Romeo's Daughter.

In 1989, Parr played the lead role in the soundtrack album for Paris, an epic rock opera written by Jon English and David Mackay. Parr performed with the London Symphony Orchestra alongside Harry Nilsson, Demis Roussos, Francis Rossi and Barry Humphries.

Parr is also known for co-writing "The Best (A Man Can Get)", the theme used in a series of highly successful Gillette razor commercials from the 1980s onwards, also spawning the company's chief slogan. A solo acoustic version appears on the album Letter to America.

2000s
After ten years out of the music business, Parr returned in 2006. An unconnected dance remix of "St. Elmo's Fire", entitled "New Horizon", hit the Top 40 that same year.

In 2007, Parr joined Bryan Adams on his tour.

On 26 March 2007, Parr released "Walking Out of the Darkness", a tribute to Doncaster Rovers F.C. ahead of the club's appearance in the Football League Trophy final at Cardiff's Millennium Stadium on 1 April 2007.

In May 2007, Parr returned to Canada to perform at the Man in Motion 20th anniversary. Parr's song "St Elmo's Fire (Man in Motion)" was wheelchair athlete Rick Hansen's anthem, helping him wheel 40,000 kilometres (25,000 miles) around the globe and raising awareness and money for spinal research. To date, the Rick Hansen foundation has raised $200 million and helped build a research centre, ICORD, in Vancouver, British Columbia.

In June 2007, Parr wrote and recorded the main title for Sony Pictures, The Brothers Solomon, directed by Bob Odenkirk.

On 20 July 2007, Parr and his band opened for Bryan Adams at the Keepmoat Stadium in Parr's home town Doncaster. Twenty years earlier, Parr joined Adams in his home town where they played to 75,000 at the Canadian Exhibition Centre in Vancouver.

In June 2008, Parr was a special guest for the U.S. rock band Journey on their UK tour.

In May 2011, Parr performed an acoustic set as a special guest of Richard Marx on his UK tour.

Parr released a double album titled Letter to America on 1 June 2011, and subsequently toured in America.

On 11 October 2011, Parr was a guest on ESPN show, SportsNation, where he sang a special rendition of "St. Elmo's Fire", replacing the words with Denver Broncos quarterback Tim Tebow. A reworking of the song's lyrics, sung by Parr and titled "Tim Tebow's Fire", went viral on YouTube: as of 13 January 2012 it had received  over 19,000,000 views. The video was uploaded by Denver Fox Network affiliate, KDVR.

Throughout 2012, Parr toured America as ambassador for the USO playing concerts and benefits for American servicemen and women. That same year, he wrote and produced a new studio album The Mission. The funds went to the USO, USA Cares and Military Families charities. Parr's quest is to raise funds and awareness of the welfare of military personnel as they return home from active duty and transition back into civilian life.

In 2014, Parr reunited with The Who, Jeff Beck, Mick Hucknall and other rock musicians for Kenney Jones' Rock & Horsepower concert to raise money and awareness for prostate cancer. Back at his studio "Somewhere in Yorkshire" he joined forces with Guns N' Roses producer Mike Clink, who along with Slash and Nikki Sixx, collaborated on the forthcoming Pete Way album. At the O2, Parr joined producer Tony Visconti, Woody Woodmansey (Spiders From Mars), Glenn Gregory (Heaven 17) and many members of the original Bowie band to perform in the "Man Who Sold the World" concert. Parr continued his work with the military playing concerts and fund raisers for Help For Heroes. Christmas 2014 saw the release of "Ring Out The Bells", a charity single produced by David Mackay, which featured Charlie Norman and the children of St Catherine's School along with guest performances by Parr and Meatloaf duetist Lorraine Crosby. The proceeds went to the Great Ormond Street Children's Hospital.

2015 saw Parr on the road doing international and UK shows with Bonnie Tyler, Kenney Jones and Cockney Rebel. He also wrote and recorded "Man of Steel" for the late rugby league footballer; Steve Prescott.

In 2016, the 88th Academy Awards (Oscars) included the launch of Google's Android campaign featuring Parr and "St Elmo's Fire" as the theme tune.

After a year of travel in 2017, in 2018 Parr returned to the studio to begin work on his seventh album and to do some shows close to his heart, namely the BBC Tracks of My Years show with Ken Bruce, The Story Behind the Song for the BBC One Show anchored by Carrie Grant and Foreigner’s 40th Anniversary tour, culminating at the Albert Hall and later as special guest for Jeff Beck.

Family life
One of Parr's sons, Ben, is an actor who is best known for the role of Freddie in the soap Hollyoaks. His first appearance was in the episode broadcast on 4 January 2007. He also appeared in the BBC drama The Curse of Steptoe.

Discography

Studio albums
 John Parr (1984)
 Running the Endless Mile (1986)
 Man with a Vision (1992)
 Under Parr (1996)
 The Mission (2012)

Live albums
Letter to America (2011)

Soundtrack albums
Paris (1989)

Singles

References

External links 
 

1952 births
Living people
English rock guitarists
English rock bass guitarists
Male bass guitarists
English male singers
English songwriters
English rock singers
Musicians from Nottinghamshire
People from Worksop
Atlantic Records artists
Hansa Records artists
British male songwriters